The Medical and Health Workers' Union of Nigeria (MHWUN) is a trade union representing medical workers in Nigeria.

History
The union was founded in 1978, when the Government of Nigeria merged the following unions:

 Animal Health Workers' Union of Nigeria
 Association of Public Health Inspectors of Nigeria
 Catholic Hospital Workers' Union
 Dispensary Overseers Workers' Union
 Eastern Region Nigeria Union of Rural Health Workers' Union
 Government Health Department D/P Workers' Union of Northern Nigeria
 Medical and Health Department Workers' Union of Nigeria
 Medical Technical Workers' Union
 Nigerian Baptist Mission Medical and General Workers' Union
 Nigerian Medical Records Workers' Union
 Nigerian Union of Dispensing Attendants
 Nursing and Health Auxiliary Staff Association
 Orthopaedic Limb Workers' Union of Western Nigeria
 Sacred Heart Hospital General Workers' Union of Nigeria
 Tuberculosis Preventive Staff Association
 Tse-Tse and Trypanosomiasis Staff Association, Federation of Nigeria
 Uromi Catholic Hospital Workers' Union

In 1978, the union was a founding an affiliate of the Nigeria Labour Congress.  It had 41,000 members by 1988, growing to 100,000 by 1995, but falling back to 45,000 in 2005.

Leadership

Presidents
1978: Pa A. A. Akinbola
1980: Y. O. Ozigi
1990: Emeka Okwonkwo
1996: Godwin Wokeh
2000: Mohammed Erena
2004: Ayuba Wabba
2016: Biobelemoye Josiah

General Secretaries
1978: J. A. Alajo
1984: J. A. Mbah
1998: S. O. Joshua
2000: J. A. Ogunseyin
2003: Marcus Omokhuale
2016: Kabiru Ado Sani

External links

References

Healthcare trade unions
Trade unions established in 1978
Trade unions in Nigeria